Willis Chapman "Chip" Arndt Jr. (born October 2, 1966) is an American gay activist, best known as a winner of The Amazing Race 4 in 2003 with former partner Reichen Lehmkuhl. Arndt attended Hotchkiss School, Yale University, and  Harvard University, where he was the president of the Harvard Business School Gay and Lesbian Student Association. Prior to The Amazing Race, he worked as an investment banker.

Early life
The youngest and only boy of four children, Arndt attended Hotchkiss School, a private school in his native Connecticut, and won a fellowship to a 13th year at Harrow College in Northwest London. He earned his undergraduate degree in history, with honors, at Yale University in 1990, where he was captain of the golf team. He worked for five years as an investment banker for Morgan Stanley as well as in the entertainment industry in Los Angeles. He then entered Harvard University for an MBA in 1996. He was president of the Harvard Graduate School Leadership and Ethics Forum, chairman and founder of the Annual Harvard Business, Law, and Harvard Kennedy School Debate, and president of the Harvard Business School Gay and Lesbian Student Association.

The Amazing Race

Arndt and former partner Reichen Lehmkuhl competed against eleven other teams the fourth season, taped in January and February 2003, and premiering in May. The couple, who had met in 1999 while Reichen was still in the United States Air Force, had a commitment ceremony on February 2, 2002. While not legally married, they had asked that  CBS identify them as a married couple. The identification of a gay couple as married drew criticism from anti-gay groups. By the final episode, Reichen and Chip had an 83% popularity rating on the show's official website. Arndt performed seven of eleven roadblocks (tasks only one team member can perform). In total, they placed second on five legs of the race, with their win on the final leg being their second first place, eight minutes ahead of runners up Kelly and Jon. The finale was broadcast on August 21, 2003, with CBS winning both its time slot and the night. Season 4 would later win an Emmy award for Outstanding Reality-Competition Program.

In January 2003, Arndt competed on the fourth season of the CBS adventure reality show The Amazing Race with his "husband" Reichen Lehmkuhl. The two reached the final leg of the race and won the season.

The Amazing Race 4 finishes

A  indicates that Reichen and Chip won the Fast Forward. 

Roadblocks performed by Arndt are bolded 

Notes

Post-Amazing Race
Arndt has been active in the LGBT community following the win, and has appeared on the cover of The Advocate. Later that month, Arndt addressed a group of gay-straight alliance leaders. Express Gay News named him "Best Local Male Hero" for using "his fame and good fortune to help others." He is a spokesperson for the annual five-state Braking the Cycle AIDS ride benefiting New York's GLBT Community Center, and Miami's SMART AIDS rides, and has helped raise money for other groups including the Point Foundation, the Human Rights Campaign, and the Matthew Shepard Foundation for which he is a Strategic Advisor. He is a co-Director of The Gay American Heroes Foundation, (founded by Scott Hall ) and the website CoupleForEquality.com. Arndt was also one of the commentators on the official CBS Website for The Amazing Race 10, where he answered questions from fans of the show about his experiences and behind-the-scenes knowledge about the series, and revealed that he accidentally ran into the returning teams secretly chosen for the program's 11th season, the anticipated "All Stars" version, at an airport.

Each year, Arndt conducts a golf clinic at the Advocate Golf Classic benefiting the National Gay & Lesbian Task Force (NGLTF). As the former Public Relations and Marketing Manager for Care Resource, South Florida's oldest and largest HIV/AIDS services organization, he produced the 2005 AIDS Walk Miami, and spearheaded the 21st annual White Party, its week-long fund-raiser, which, at his initiative, emphasized a zero tolerance drugs policy for the first time. Other charity initiative includes a US$100,000 challenge benefiting nine HIV/AIDS service organizations through his participation in two AIDS ride and two AIDS walks in 2007, and solicited donations via a special MySpace page.

Currently, he is Executive Vice President and Director of Business Development at Merchant Advantage, a Miami-based e-commerce software company he helped found.

Arndt was elected a PLEO (Party Leader and Elected Official) Obama delegate to the 2008 Democratic National Convention and was named one of Florida's 27 electors representing the state in the Electoral College.  He cast his vote in the state capital of Tallahassee, Florida for President-elect Obama and Vice President-elect Biden. Arndt was the first openly gay man to have cast an electoral vote in the state of Florida.

References

External links

 The Advocate 2003 article

Living people
1966 births
People from West Hartford, Connecticut
LGBT people from Connecticut
American gay men
The Amazing Race (American TV series) contestants
Reality show winners
Harvard Business School alumni
Yale University alumni
2008 United States presidential electors